Matiar Kuthi  is a village in the Mathabhanga II CD block in the Mathabhanga subdivision of the Cooch Behar district  in the state of West Bengal, India.

Geography

Location

Area overview
The map alongside shows the western part of the district. In Mekhliganj subdivision 9.91% of the population lives in the urban areas and 90.09% lives in the rural areas. In Mathabhanga subdivision 3.67% of the population, the lowest in the district, lives in the urban areas and 96.35% lives in the rural areas. The entire district forms the flat alluvial flood plains of mighty rivers.

Note: The map alongside presents some of the notable locations in the subdivisions. All places marked in the map are linked in the larger full screen map.

Civic administration

CD block HQ
The headquarters of the Mathabhanga II CD block are located at Matiar Kuthi.

Demographics
As per the 2011 Census of India, Matiar Kuthi had a total population of 1,592.  There were 819 (51%) males and 773 (49%) females. There were 204 persons in the age range of 0 to 6 years. The total number of literate people in Matiar Kuthi was 904 (65.13% of the population over 6 years).

References

Villages in Cooch Behar district